Flowers in the Dirt is the eighth studio solo album by Paul McCartney. The album was released on 5 June 1989 on Parlophone, as he was embarking on his first world tour since the Wings Over the World tour in 1975–76. It earned McCartney some of his best reviews for an album of original songs since Tug of War (1982). The album made number one in the United Kingdom and Norway and produced several hit singles (the first being "My Brave Face"). The album artwork was a collaboration between artist Brian Clarke, who painted the canvas and arranged the flowers, and Linda McCartney, who produced the cover photography. 

The album was reissued in an expanded form under the Paul McCartney Archive Collection project in March 2017, with the original demos recorded by McCartney and Elvis Costello included as part of the release.

Background and recording
After the meager sales for Press to Play, McCartney realised that he needed to work much harder on his follow-up. Thus, he not only teamed up with several different producers, but also spent the better part of 18 months perfecting Flowers in the Dirt. A highlight of the sessions was McCartney's alliance with Elvis Costello, with whom he composed many new songs. In his 2015 autobiography, Unfaithful Music & Disappearing Ink, Costello described the track "That Day Is Done" as, "the unhappy sequel to 'Veronica'", which they had also co-written. Despite Costello's similarities to John Lennon, the partnership was not to endure. McCartney's then manager, Richard Ogden, confided at the time to Beatles historian Mark Lewisohn that the relationship between Costello and the former Beatle was "not entirely harmonious" and that at points McCartney had gone as far as to rant at him regarding Costello's attitude and approach to the sessions. Costello would appear on the album, even co-singing "You Want Her Too" with McCartney. Another guest included was his friend David Gilmour from Pink Floyd, who plays the guitar on "We Got Married". On "Put It There", McCartney used an old Buddy Holly trick, the knee-percussion, that McCartney recorded on the same day as the backing track.

Cover art
The album cover was conceived and designed by the McCartneys' friend and collaborator, the British artist Brian Clarke, who painted the background painting in oil on canvas. Clarke arranged the flowers and foliage and the cover was photographed by Linda McCartney. The two collaborated on multiple unique arrangements, resulting in Linda's series of Cibachrome images. Clarke was also responsible for designing stage sets and promotional material for the world tour which accompanied the album. A series of Flowers in the Dirt paintings and arrangements were made, and the full set of collaborative photographs that produced the cover artwork were exhibited that same year at the Mayor Gallery in London.

Release

With the intention of launching the biggest tour of his career, McCartney assembled a band to take out on the road, and who would appear in various forms on Flowers in the Dirt. Hamish Stuart was best known for his tenure in Average White Band, while Robbie McIntosh had been a member of the Pretenders. Filling out the sound would be Chris Whitten on drums and Paul "Wix" Wickens joining McCartney's wife Linda McCartney on keyboards. The Paul McCartney World Tour opened on 26 September 1989 and featured concerts in North America, Europe, Japan and Brazil until the following July.

Finally, early in 1989, the project was ready for release. In May, the Beatlesque "My Brave Face" was released as a single and promptly gave McCartney a US hit, reaching number 25, while reaching number 18 in the UK. In June, Flowers in the Dirt was released to high anticipation and went to number 1 in the UK charts, garnering very positive reviews from all around. In the US, the reaction was better than Press to Play, with the album reaching number 21, staying on the charts for a year and going gold, though it still sold beneath expectations. The second single, "This One", also reached number 18 in the UK. The follow-ups "Figure of Eight"/"Où est le Soleil?" and "Put It There" would all be minor UK hits.

A limited-edition "World Tour Pack" of Flowers in the Dirt, sold in a facsimile trunk, was issued in Britain in October 1989, and America (with British catalogue numbers) in January 1990. The set included a bonus single of "Party Party" (mixed by Bruce Forest and released on a one-sided 7" single in vinyl editions of the "World Tour Pack" and a 3" CD-single in compact disc editions of the "World Tour Pack"). In March 1990, another limited edition of the album that featured a bonus disc was released exclusively in Japan and re-entered the country's chart.

Reissues
A remastered CD was released in 1993 as part of The Paul McCartney Collection with several bonus tracks.

The album was re-issued on March 24, 2017, by Capitol Music Group as the tenth release in the ongoing Paul McCartney Archive Collection. Formats included a two-disc (CD) Special Edition (the second disc included McCartney and Costello's demos recorded prior to the album's sessions), a two LP vinyl edition, and a three disc (CD) and DVD Deluxe Edition Box Set that featured previously unreleased demos, unseen archival videos, a notebook of Paul's handwritten lyrics and notes, Linda McCartney Flowers in the Dirt Exhibition Catalogue, and a 112-page hardcover book documenting the making of the album.

The album features the song "The Lovers That Never Were". Costello said of the song:

"So Like Candy" and "Playboy to a Man" appear in finished versions on Elvis Costello’s 1991 album Mighty Like a Rose.

Critical reception
Reviewing for AllMusic, critic Stephen Thomas Erlewine wrote of the album: "Paul McCartney must not only have been conscious of his slipping commercial fortunes, he must have realised that his records hadn't been treated seriously for years, so he decided to make a full-fledged comeback effort with Flowers in the Dirt."

Writing for the Chicago Tribune, David Silverman wrote that the album was "a welcome, if not wholly fantastic, return from the fabbest of the Fab Four".

Cover versions
Phil Keaggy covered "Motor of Love" on his 2000 album Inseparable and on his 2012 album The Cover of Love.

Track listing

Additional CD and cassette track

Special editions

Special Package (1990 Japanese tour edition) – bonus disc

All songs written by Paul McCartney except "The Long and Winding Road" and "P.S. Love Me Do" written by Lennon–McCartney, and "Party, Party" written with Linda McCartney, Robbie McIntosh, Hamish Stuart, Chris Whitten, and Paul "Wix" Wickens.

"Message" – 0:28
"The Long and Winding Road" – 3:51 
"Loveliest Thing" – 3:59 
"Rough Ride – Extended Version" – 4:53 
"Ou Est Le Soleil? – 7" Mix" – 4:50 
"Mama's Little Girl" – 3:41 
"Same Time Next Year" – 3:06 
"Party, Party" – 5:35 
"P.S. Love Me Do" – 3:40

Archive Collection Reissue
Special Edition two-CD; the original 13-track album on the first disc, plus 9 bonus tracks of Paul and Elvis's previously unreleased original demos on a second disc;
Best Buy Special Edition two-CD + 7-inch single; same as Special Edition with additional "My Brave Face" b/w "Flying to My Home" limited collectors 7-inch vinyl coloured single;
Deluxe Edition three-CD/one-DVD;
the original 13-track disc one remastered for all the new configurations at Abbey Road Studios;
18 bonus audio tracks across two discs, featuring previously unreleased demos, written and performed by Paul with Elvis Costello;
three unheard cassette demos, as well as a collection of original B-sides, remixes and single edits as digital downloads only;
a 32-page notebook of Paul's handwritten lyrics and notes, a catalogue for Linda McCartney's 1989 Flowers in the Dirt photo exhibition, a 64-page photo book featuring the music videos for 'This One', and a 112-page book telling the story of making of the album;
a DVD includes all the music videos from the album, three new short films with unseen archive material that show some of the creation process of the album and the documentary Put It There originally released on VHS in 1989;
an access to downloadable 24bit 96 kHz high-resolution audio versions of the remastered album and bonus audio tracks.
Remastered vinyl two-album with a download card. The first album includes the remastered album but in keeping with the original vinyl release does not include "Où Est Le Soleil?" (this track is available with the accompanying digital download). The second album includes McCartney's and Costello's previously unreleased original demos;
Digital Download Digital album available as both standard and special versions.
Record Store Day 2017 exclusive three-track cassette with demos of "I Don't Want to Confess", "Shallow Grave" and "Mistress and Maid" as in deluxe edition

Disc 1
The original 13-track album.

Disc 2 – Paul McCartney and Elvis Costello original demos
All songs written and performed by Paul McCartney and Declan McManus (Elvis Costello), as an acoustic duo.
"The Lovers That Never Were" – 3:58
"Tommy's Coming Home" – 4:09
"Twenty Fine Fingers" – 2:27
"So Like Candy" – 3:29
"You Want Her Too" – 2:40
"That Day Is Done" – 4:16
"Don't Be Careless Love" – 3:43
"My Brave Face" – 2:40
"Playboy to a Man" – 3:15
"The Lovers That Never Were"  – 4:05

The Geoff Emerick mix of "The Lovers That Never Were" is a hidden bonus track.

Disc 3 – Paul McCartney and Elvis Costello 1988 demos
All songs written and performed by Paul McCartney and Declan McManus (Elvis Costello), with full band accompaniment.
"The Lovers That Never Were" – 3:50
"Tommy's Coming Home" – 5:03
"Twenty Fine Fingers" – 2:47
"So Like Candy" – 3:48
"You Want Her Too" – 3:20
"That Day Is Done" – 4:22
"Don't Be Careless Love" – 3:25
"My Brave Face" – 3:30
"Playboy to a Man" – 2:55

Disc 4 – DVD
Music Videos
"My Brave Face"
"My Brave Face" 
"This One" 
"This One" 
"Figure of Eight"
"Party Party"
"Ou Est Le Soleil?"
"Put It There"
"Distractions"
"We Got Married"

Creating Flowers in the Dirt
Paul and Elvis
Buds in the Studio
The Making of "This One" 

Put It There
Put It There Documentary

Digital download only – original B-sides, remixes and single edits
All songs written by Paul McCartney except "Back on My Feet" written with Declan McManus (Elvis Costello), "The First Stone" written with Hamish Stuart, and "Party Party" written with Linda McCartney, Robbie McIntosh, Hamish Stuart, Chris Whitten, and Paul "Wix" Wickens.

"Back On My Feet" – 4:24
"Flying To My Home" – 4:15
"The First Stone" – 4:06
"Good Sign" – 6:59
"This One"  – 6:11
"Figure of Eight"  – 5:14
"Loveliest Thing" – 4:03
"Ou Est Le Soleil?"  – 7:06
"Ou Est Le Soleil?"  – 4:30
"Ou Est Le Soleil?"  – 4:53
"Ou Est Le Soleil?"  – 4:29
"Party Party"  – 5:32
"Party Party"  – 6:21

Digital download only – Paul McCartney and Elvis Costello cassette demos
All songs written and performed by Paul McCartney and Declan McManus (Elvis Costello).
"I Don't Want to Confess" – 2:21
"Shallow Grave" – 2:14
"Mistress and Maid" – 2:29

Digital-only bonus tracks Available only on Paulmccartney.com
"Distractions"  – 4:56
"This One"  – 3:26
"Back On My Feet"  – 3:23

Personnel

Paul McCartney – vocals (lead and backing), guitar (acoustic, bass guitar, electric, 12-string and Mexican), piano, synthesizer, drums, tambourine, percussion, celeste, sitar, wine glasses, harmonium, hand claps, finger snaps, mellotron, flugelhorn, bongos, keyboards, woodsaw
Linda McCartney – Minimoog, backing vocals, hand claps
Robbie McIntosh – guitar (acoustic and electric)
Hamish Stuart – guitar (electric, acoustic and bass guitar), percussion, backing vocals
Chris Whitten – drums, percussion, hand claps, synth drums
Paul Wickens – keyboards
Elvis Costello – vocals (backing and co-lead), keyboards
David Gilmour – electric guitar on "We Got Married"
Greg Hawkes – keyboards on "Motor of Love"
David Foster – keyboards
Dave Mattacks – drums
Guy Barker – trumpet
Stephen Lipson – computer & drum programming, guitar (electric and bass), keyboards
Peter Henderson – computer programming
Trevor Horn – keyboards, hand claps
Nicky Hopkins – piano
Mitchell Froom – keyboards
David Rhodes – EBow guitar
Judd Lander – harmonica
Chris Davis – saxophone
Chris White – saxophone
Dave Bishop – saxophone
John Taylor – cornet
Tony Goddard – cornet
Ian Peters – euphonium
Ian Harper – tenor horn
Jah Bunny – tongue styley
Eddie Klein – additional computer programming
Clare Fischer – orchestral arrangement on "Distractions"

Accolades

Grammy Awards 

|-
| width="35" align="center"|1990 || Flowers in the Dirt || Best Engineered Non-classical Album || 
|-

Brit Awards 

|-
| width="35" align="center" |1990|| "My Brave Face" || Best Music Video || 
|-

Charts

Weekly charts

Year-end charts

Certifications and sales

Notes
A^ Aside from standard version, Double-CD deluxe edition subtitled Special Package released in Japan. In 1990, it peaked at No. 27 on the chart and entered there for 4 weeks.
B^ Combined sales of standard edition and its expanded reissue.

References

External links

JPGR's Beatles site: Paul McCartney's Flowers in the Dirt

Paul McCartney albums
1989 albums
Parlophone albums
Albums produced by Trevor Horn
Albums produced by Paul McCartney
Albums produced by George Martin
Albums produced by Elvis Costello
Albums produced by Stephen Lipson
Albums produced by Mitchell Froom
Albums produced by Chris Hughes (musician)
Albums recorded in a home studio
Albums recorded at Olympic Sound Studios